Armida is a beautiful enchantress in Torquato Tasso's Jerusalem Delivered.

Armida may also refer to:

Music and operas
 A character in the epic poem Jerusalem Delivered; includes an extensive list of works based on the poem
L'Armida, a 1641 opera by Italian composer Marco Marazzoli
Armide (Lully), a 1686 opera by French composer Jean-Baptiste Lully
L'Armida, by Carl Heinrich Graun (Berlin, 1751)
Armida (Salieri), by Antonio Salieri (Vienna, 1771)
Armida (Sacchini), by Antonio Sacchini (Milan, 1772)
Armide (Gluck), by Christoph Willibald Gluck (Paris, 1777)
Armida (Mysliveček), by Josef Mysliveček (Milan, 1780)
Armida (Haydn), by Joseph Haydn (1784)
Armida (Rossini), by Gioacchino Rossini (Naples, 1817)
Armida (Dvořák), by Antonín Dvořák (1904)
Armida (Weir), by Judith Weir (2005)
 An 1855 ballet by Cesare Pugni, and Jules Perrot

Other uses
 514 Armida, a minor planet
 Armida (actress) or Armida Vendrell (1911–1989), Mexican actress, singer, dancer and vaudevillian
 Armida Publications, a publishing house in Nicosia, Cyprus
 Armida Rowing Club, an Italian rowing club, Turin, Italy